Eucalyptus livida, commonly known as wandoo mallee, is a species of mallee or small tree that is endemic to Western Australia. It has smooth bark, lance-shaped adult leaves, flower buds in groups of eleven or more, creamy white flowers and barrel-shaped fruit.

Description
It has smooth, greyish and orange bark.

Taxonomy and naming
Eucalyptus livida was first formally described in 1991 by Ian Brooker and Stephen Hopper from a specimen collected by Brooker near Peak Charles in 1988. The description was published in the journal Nuytsia. The specific epithet (livida) is a Latin word meaning "bluish", or "lead-coloured" referring to the colour of the crown of this species.

Distribution and habitat
Wandoo mallee is found among decomposing rocky breakaway areas, growing in sandy-loamy soils over granite or ironstone. It occurs in the central and southern goldfields, especially between Coolgardie, Norseman, Peak Charles and Hatters Hill, where it is sometimes the dominant species.

Conservation status
This eucalypt is classified as "not threatened" in Western Australia by the Western Australian Government Department of Parks and Wildlife.

See also
List of Eucalyptus species

References

Eucalypts of Western Australia
Trees of Australia
livida
Myrtales of Australia
Plants described in 1991
Taxa named by Ian Brooker
Taxa named by Stephen Hopper
Endemic flora of Southwest Australia
Coolgardie woodlands
Great Western Woodlands